Arakeri may refer to the following places in Karnataka, India:

 Arakeri, Bijapur
 Arakeri, Bagalkot